Del Norte Coast Redwoods State Park is a state park of California, United States, and a component of the Redwood National and State Parks. The property is about half old-growth forest of coast redwoods and includes  of wild Pacific coastline.  The park was significantly expanded in 2002 with the  Mill Creek Addition.  Originally established in 1925, the park is now  . The park was designated part of the California Coast Ranges International Biosphere Reserve in 1983.

Proposals for closure
A proposal to close a portion of this park placed it on the list of 48 California state parks proposed for closure in January 2008 by  Governor Arnold Schwarzenegger as part of a deficit reduction program. The decision was rescinded following public outcry. However, in May 2011 the park was one of 70 state parks threatened with closure.  In October 2011 the National Park Service agreed to provisionally take over management of Del Norte Coast Redwoods for one year.

See also
List of California state parks

References

External links
California State Parks: official Del Norte Coast Redwoods State Park website

Redwood National and State Parks
State parks of California
Parks in Del Norte County, California
Coast redwood groves
Old-growth forests
Campgrounds in California
Protected areas established in 1925
1925 establishments in California